Carpenter Valley is an unincorporated community in Nevada County, California, United States. Situated at the north fork of Prosser Creek, it is said to be named for John S. Carpenter, who in the 1860s was engaged in hauling logs to "Old Hobart Mills".

References

Unincorporated communities in California
Unincorporated communities in Nevada County, California